The Russian Federation of Practical Shooting (Federatsia Prakticheskoi Strelbi Rossii) is the association for practical shooting in Russia under the International Practical Shooting Confederation (IPSC).

In reaction to the 2022 Russian invasion of Ukraine, the IPSC cancelled all scheduled and future level 3 and above international competitions in Russia.  The President of IPSC, Vitaly Kryuchin, is Russian.

See also 
 2017 IPSC Rifle World Shoot in Russia
 Russian Handgun Championship
 Russian Rifle Championship
 Russian Shotgun Championship

External links 
 Official homepage of the Russian Federation of Practical Shooting

References 

Regions of the International Practical Shooting Confederation
Sports organizations of Russia